Émile Mercier was a French competitor in the sport of archery.  Mercier competed in one event, taking third place in the 50 metre Au Chapelet competition. He is now considered by the International Olympic Committee to have won a bronze medal.  No scores are known from that competition.

See also
 Archery at the 1900 Summer Olympics

Notes
  - Prizes at the time were silver medals for first place and bronze medals for second, as well as usually including cash awards.  The current gold, silver, bronze medal system was initiated at the 1904 Summer Olympics.  The International Olympic Committee has retroactively assigned medals in the current system to top three placers at early Olympics.

References

Sources
 International Olympic Committee medal winners database

External links

Year of birth missing
Year of death missing
Archers at the 1900 Summer Olympics
Olympic archers of France
Olympic bronze medalists for France
French male archers
Olympic medalists in archery
Medalists at the 1900 Summer Olympics
Place of birth missing
Place of death missing